The World's Greatest Unsolved Crimes is a book written by Roger Boar and Nigel Blundell which was first published in 1984 by Octopus Books as part of their World's Greatest series. It contains accounts of various unsolved mysteries such as murders, unexplained disappearances and scandals.

Greatest Unsolved Crimes

Who Saran wrapped PJ’s Honda Civic? (Largest scale investigation in the history of Nassau County,NY)Advertisement of Death - the murder of Josephine BackshallThe Green Bicycle Murder - better known as the Green Bicycle CaseThe Enigma of Nuremberg - the story of Kaspar HauserSherlock Holmes' Real Case - the trial of Oscar Slater and Arthur Conan Doyle's involvementDead Men Cannot Talk - the sinking of the MS Georges PhilipparDisappearing Dorothy - the disappearance of Dorothy ForsteinMystery at Wolf's Neck - the death of Evelyn FosterSpring-Heeled Jack, The Demon of London - the sightings of Spring-heeled JackThe World's Last Airship - the Hindenburg disaster

 Part 2: Crimes of Our Time The Computer as Crook - the computer fraud of Jerry SchneiderA Sadistic Revenge - the disappearance of Dora Bloch in Idi Amin's UgandaPiracy 20th Century Style - an account of modern-day piracy in the CaribbeanDouble Dealing at the Dogs - a greyhound racing scam at White City, London in 1945A Fatal Flight - the disappearance of two SAETA Airliners over the Andes

 Part 3: Crimes of Greed Conviction Without a Corpse - the disappearance of Muriel McKayDoctor Death - the trial of John Bodkin AdamsThe Nazi's Gold - the widespread theft carried out by the Nazi Party during World War IIThe Unpaid Debt - the murder of Arnold RothsteinThe Black Widow - the serial murderer, Belle GunnessThe Wreck of the Chantiloupe - the sinking of the Chantiloupe and the murder of Mrs. James Burke

 Part 4: Vanishing Tricks The Disappearing Parachutist - the aircraft hijacking committed by D. B. CooperThe Canine Sherlock Holmes - the discovery of the missing FIFA World Cup Trophy by Pickles the dogThe Missing Murderers - the fate of Nazi war criminals who fled after World War IIFrance's Uncrowned King - Louis XVII of France and the many imposters claiming to be himThe Sinking of the Salem - the staged sinking of the Salem oil tanker for the sake of an insurance fraudA Peer's Great Gamble - the famous disappearance of Richard Bingham, 7th Earl of LucanSuspect Deceased - the disappearance of Linda SturleyThe Disappearance of Goodtime Joe - Joseph Force CraterDeath at the Opera House - the disappearance of Ambrose SmallThe Impossible is Possible - the murder of Roy OrsiniA Riddle in Life and a Riddle in Death - the disappearance of Jimmy Hoffa and the surrounding conspiracy theoryThe Mysterious Mummy - an ornamental mummy which was discovered to contain a real corpse during the filming of a Six Million Dollar Man episodeThe Prairie's Murder Inn - the Bloody Benders, a family of serial killersWho Did She Bury? - the disappearance of Nels Stenstrom and the strange funeral ceremony conducted in his absenceAcrobats of Death - the murder of Ugo Pavesi by a man described by witnesses as a giantThe Oldest Kidnap Victim? - The discovery of Homo erectus pekinensis and the complete disappearance of the fossils in transit

 Part 5: Murder Most Foul House of Horror - the murder by Timothy Evans of his infant daughterPoetry, Passion and Prison - the Pimlico MysteryThe Vicar and the Choirmistress - the murder of Eleanor Mills along with her vicar lover and the severing of their vocal foldsDeath in Happy Valley - the murder of Josslyn Hay, 22nd Earl of ErrollLizzie and the Axe - the trial of Lizzie BordenThe Harry Oakes Affair - the murder of Harry OakesKillings in the Congo - the murder of Patrice Lumumba and the death of Dag HammarskjöldStreets of Fear - serial killer, Jack the RipperJack the Stripper - serial killer, Jack the StripperDeath in the Churchyard - the murder of Olive BennettThe Arm in the Shark Case - the discovery of a severed human arm in the body of a tiger shark and subsequent murder investigationThe Motorway Monster - the murder of Barbara Mayo, a hitchhikerDeath of the Black Dahlia - the murder of Elizabeth ShortThe Torso in the Trunk - a gruesome discovery in a trunk at Brighton railway stationKatyn - 1940'' - the unattributed Katyn massacre

References

External links
Information Page

1984 non-fiction books
Non-fiction crime books
British non-fiction books
Collaborative non-fiction books